For the Love is the ninth studio album by American country music artist Tracy Lawrence, released on January 30, 2007 through his personal label Rocky Comfort Records. It debuted at #53 on the Billboard 200. Three singles were released from the album: "Find Out Who Your Friends Are" reached #1 on the Billboard Hot Country Songs chart and became Lawrence's first chart-topping song since "Time Marches On" in mid-1996. The album's second single, "Til I Was a Daddy Too", reached #32 on the same chart. "You Can't Hide Redneck" was released in October 2008 as the third single.

Track listing

Non-album Tracks
"I'm Gonna Finish Leaving You" (Tony Martin, Mark Nesler, Tom Shapiro) - 3:25
B-side of "Til I Was a Daddy Too"
"What You Want" (Casey Beathard) - 3:23
B-side of "You Can't Hide Redneck"

Personnel
Brad Arnold - vocals on track 4
Eddie Bayers - drums
Mike Brignardello - bass guitar
Joe Caverlee - fiddle
Kenny Chesney - vocals on track 11
Dan Dugmore - steel guitar, Dobro
Paul Franklin - steel guitar, dobro
Tony Harrell - piano, keyboards
Aubrey Haynie - fiddle
Patrick Lassiter - bass guitar
Tracy Lawrence - lead vocals
B. James Lowry - acoustic guitar
Brent Mason - electric guitar
Tim McGraw - vocals on track 11
Steve Nathan - piano, keyboards
Loren Nelson - steel guitar, dobro
Dennis Parker - acoustic guitar
Steve Poole - piano, keyboards
Darryl Preston - electric guitar
Gregg Stocki - drums
Glenn Worf - bass guitar

Charts

Weekly charts

Year-end charts

References

[ For the Love] at Allmusic

2007 albums
Tracy Lawrence albums
Albums produced by Julian King (recording engineer)